The 2007 Sylvania 300 was the 27th race of the 2007 NASCAR Nextel Cup season and the first of the ten-race 2007 Chase for the Nextel Cup championship series.

This racing event was run on Sunday, September 16, 2007, at New Hampshire International Speedway in Loudon, New Hampshire, and was the twelfth race to use the Car of Tomorrow template that would be used full-time starting in 2008.

Pre-race news
Ken Schrader returns to the #21 Wood Brothers/JTG Racing Ford Fusion.

Qualifying
2007 Chase driver Clint Bowyer of Richard Childress Racing, with a speed of 130.412 mph, grabbed his second career pole. Fellow Chase newcomer Martin Truex Jr. will start alongside him.

Failed to Qualify:  Dale Jarrett (#44), Sam Hornish Jr. (#06), Jeremy Mayfield (#36), Michael Waltrip (#55), Kevin Lepage (#37), Boris Said (#98).*

 — Note: The #49 car of John Andretti failed a test in the post-qualifying inspection. As a result, his time, which would have locked him in the race, was disqualified, allowing Said to get into the race.

Race
For Clint Bowyer, he would enter the Chase as the only driver without a victory. That all changed on Sunday when Bowyer and the 07 team flat out crushed the field, leading 222 of 300 laps en route to his first career victory. In the process, he leaped from 12th place in the Chase to fourth with the victory.  Jeff Gordon finished second, followed by Tony Stewart.  Jimmie Johnson retained the lead on Jeff Gordon in the Chase on more wins (six to four).

For the first time since the 1996 Tyson Holly Farms 400 at North Wilkesboro Speedway, the entire starting field finished a NASCAR Cup Series race.  This was only the fourth time in NASCAR history that this has happened; the 1959 200-lap race at the Music City Motorplex where all 12 starting cars finished, two consecutive Tyson Holly Farm 400 races (1995–96) at North Wilkesboro Speedway where all 36 cars starting finished;  and the 2007 Sylvania 300 where all 43 starters finished.  This 2007 Sylvania 300 does mark the first race in NASCAR's modern era where all cars in a 43-driver field finished.

Finishing order

*Bold italics indicates drivers in the Chase.

References

Sylvania 300
Sylvania 300
NASCAR races at New Hampshire Motor Speedway
Sylvania 300